Arturo Gómez-Pompa (born 1934) is a tropical biologist, a scientific advisor for the Tropical Research Center of the Universidad Veracruzana (CITRO), and a professor emeritus of botany at the University of California, Riverside. He made various contributions to the field of tropical ecology through the creation of databases used in botanical research, and he contributed to the research on the domestication of tropical trees.

Gómez-Pompa has received numerous awards and recognition, including medals and elected positions into various academies. He continues to contribute to biology as an advisor and retired professor, and dividing his time between Irving, Texas and Xalapa, Veracruz. He is from Mexico City.

Early life and education 
Gómez-Pompa was pursuing a career in medicine to become a doctor as his parents had hoped. However, this changed when he was fourteen and spent about two weeks exploring his cousin's ranch and falling in love with nature. Seeing wildlife such as coyotes, rattlesnakes, hawks, and cougars completely changed him, and he decided to study biology instead. Gómez-Pompa eventually obtained his Doctorate in Sciences (Biology) from the National Autonomous University of Mexico (UNAM) in 1966.

Career 

Gómez-Pompa is a tropical biologist who has spent over 40 years in academics in various international institutions as a professor helping to teach generations of future leaders off science.

Gómez-Pompa's projects include these topics -  ethnobotanical studies, evolution and domestication of tropical trees, biodiversity restoration of tropical forests, agroforestry, and community-based conservation policies for the tropics.

Honorary positions 
Gómez-Pompa has been a member of the Governing Board of the Universidad Veracruzana, a member on the board of directors in the Botanical Research Institute of Texas, and the American Institute of Biological Sciences. He was also President of the Board of Directors of El Eden Ecological Reserve, and an AC member of the executive board of the Tyler Prize. Gómez-Pompa was also a member of the Advisory Committee of the Committee on Science, Space and Technology of the House of Representatives of the United States; a member on the Board of the Smithsonian Institution of Washington; the founder and member of the Board of Directors of Pro-Natura in Veracruz.

Some more academic-based positions he has occupied include Director of the Institute of the University of California for Mexico and the United States, and founder of the Research Institute on Biotic Resources. He was also head of the Department of Botany and Professor of Ecology and Botany in the Faculty of Sciences of the National University in the Institute of Biology at UNAM.

Research contributions and accomplishments 

He discovered the use of Theobroma cacao, or the tree of chocolate, as ancient crops in rejolladas and cenotes within the Yucatán Peninsula.  This confirmed his hypothesis on the anthropogenic origins of the Mayan forests and advanced future research in the domestication of tropical trees. Gómez-Pompa created a database for the Flora of Veracruz project in the 1960s that is still utilized to this day as a continuous source for many botanical institutions.

Awards 
Gómez-Pompa received the Gold Medal of Merit from Veracruz University, the David Fairchild Medal of the National Garden of the United States, the Chevron Award, the Tyler Prize for Environmental Achievement, the Luis Elizondo Prize in Science and Technology from the Technological Institute and Superior Studies of Monterrey, the Medal "Ark of Gold" ("Golden Arch") of the Government of the Netherlands, the "Alfonso L. Herrera" Medal of the Mexican Institute of Renewable Natural Resources, the Medal of "Botanical Merit" from the Botanical Society of Mexico, the Medal of Ecological Merit, and the Scholar of the Guggenheim Foundation.

Memberships 
Gómez-Pompa was also a member in various organizations and institutions such as the American Academy of Arts and Sciences of the United States, the Mexican Academy of Sciences, Third World Academy of Sciences, and the Academy of Sciences of Latin America. He was also an elected member of the Biology Committee of the Council of Scientific Research of the United States, and by the Governing Board of the University of California as the twenty-ninth University Professor which is the highest academic honor granted by the university to its professors.

Publications 
Gómez-Pompa, A., M. F. Allen and S, Fedick. 2003. Future Challenges in Research: Summary of Recommendations for Research. In: Gómez-Pompa, A. et al. (eds.). The Lowland Maya Area: three millennia at the human-wildland interface. The Haworth Press. New York.
 In this book, Gómez-Pompa and his colleagues use history, biodiversity, ethnobotany, geology, ecology, archaeology, anthropology, and other fields of study to create a guide for the Lowland Mayan Area that highlights the unique relationship between man and nature in the Yucatán peninsula.

Allen, E. B., M. F. Allen, L. Egerton-Warburton, L. Corkidi, A. Gomez-Pompa, Arturo. Impacts of early- and late-seral mycorrhizae during restoration in seasonal tropical forest, Mexico. Ecological Applications. 13(6): 1701–1717.
 Gómez-Pompa and his colleagues looked at how disturbance may change the species composition of arbuscular mycorrhizal fungi (AMF) and the plant species that are affected by them. Their results suggested that when seedlings are infused, early-seral AMF should be used for restoration.

Anaya, A. L., R. Mata, J. Sims, A. Gonzalez-Coloma, R. Cruz-Ortega, A. Guadano, B. E. Hernandez-Bautista, S. L. Midland, G. Rios, A. Gomez-Pompa, Allelochemical potential of Callicarpa acuminata. Journal of Chemical Ecology 29(12): 2761–2776.

 In this paper, Gómez-Pompa and various other scientists discuss the allelopathic roles that metabolites of M. yucatanesis play and the ecological interactions it has with its host plant and other organisms.

Gomez-Pompa, A. and A. Kaus. 1999. From prehispanic to future conservation alternatives: lessons from Mexico. Proceedings of the National Academy of Sciences 96: 5982–5986.
 In this paper, Gómez-Pompa and Andrea review past and current trends in biodiversity conservation in Mexico and search for possible reasons on how ecosystems manage to cope from a long history of depredation and inefficient conservation policies.

Heaton, H. J., R. Whitkus, and A. Gomez-Pompa. 1999. Extreme ecological and phenotypic differences in the tropical tree chicozapote (Manilkara zapota (L.) van Royen) are not matched by genetic divergence: A RAPD analysis. Molec. Ecol. 8: 627–632.
 In this paper, Gómez-Pompa and his colleagues perform a RAPD analysis on four different populations of two morphologically distinct populations of chicozapote (Manilkara zapota) to test for any genetic components that contributed to its variation between their forest and swamp habitats.

Gomez-Pompa, A. 1999. La conservacion de la biodiversidad en Mexico: mitos y realidades: mitos y realidades. Bol. Soc. Bot. Mexico. 63: 33–41.
 Gómez-Pompa writes a reflection on the problems of conservation in Mexico and what changes need to be done to better the system.

Whikus, R., M. de la Cruz, L. Mota-Bravo, A. Gomez-Pompa. 1998. Genetic diversity and relationships of wild cacao (Theobroma cacao L.) in southern Mexico. Theoret. And Appl. Genet. 96: 621–627.
 In this paper, by running a RAPD analysis, Gómez-Pompa and his colleagues found that the Maya possibly maintained plants out of their native habitats as it correlates with their early agroforestry practices. They suggest modern attempts to increase cacao germplasms should refer to ancient cultivation sites to look at their earlier genetic diversity.

References

Mexican botanists
1934 births
Living people
Scientists from Mexico City
University of California, Riverside faculty
National Autonomous University of Mexico alumni